John Russell Whitman (June 8, 1944 – July 2, 2015) was an American businessman and investment banker who served as first gentleman of New Jersey from 1994 to 2001, as the husband of Governor Christine Todd Whitman. Whitman worked in the fields of banking and financial services.

Early life and education
Whitman was born in Albany, New York in 1944. His grandfather, Charles S. Whitman, was the 41st Governor of New York (serving from 1915 to 1919), and his father, Charles Seymour Whitman Jr., was a New York civil court judge. He had a brother (Charles S. Whitman, III) and a sister (Janet Whitman).

Whitman earned a bachelor's degree from Yale University, graduating in 1966. He then served as a first lieutenant in the US Army during the Vietnam War. He received an MBA from Harvard Business School in 1971.

Career
Whitman began his banking career with Citicorp in 1972, eventually rising to Vice President in charge of the Corporate Finance Department of Citicorp International Bank Ltd. in London.

Whitman served as Chairman and CEO of Prudential-Bache Interfunding from 1987 to 1990. He also was the managing partner of Sycamore Ventures, an international venture capital fund incorporated in the Cayman Islands.

During his wife's term as Governor of New Jersey, Whitman held no official role in her administration. He was appointed by his wife as co-chairman of the New Jersey World Cup Host Committee in 1994. He also mediated the 1995 negotiations between the New Jersey Devils and the New Jersey Sports and Exposition Authority that kept the Devils from moving to Nashville, Tennessee. In 1997, Whitman was appointed by his wife to head the fund raising committee to restore the dome of the New Jersey State House.

Personal life
Whitman had met his future wife before they went on their first date, which occurred in 1973 at President Richard M. Nixon's inaugural ball. Whitman married the former Christine "Christie" Todd in 1974. They resided on a farm in the Oldwick section of Tewksbury Township, New Jersey. They had a son, Taylor, and a daughter, Kate, and six grandchildren.

On June 19, 2015, Whitman fell, resulting in a catastrophic brain injury. He died in a hospital at Morristown, New Jersey on July 2, 2015, at the age of 71.

References 

1944 births
2015 deaths
First Ladies and Gentlemen of New Jersey
Harvard Business School alumni
American investment bankers
20th-century American businesspeople
21st-century American businesspeople
Businesspeople from Albany, New York
People from Tewksbury Township, New Jersey
Businesspeople from New Jersey
Accidental deaths from falls
Accidental deaths in New Jersey
Deaths from head injury
Yale University alumni
New Jersey Republicans